Martha Salazar (born February 2, 1970, Ocotlán, Jalisco, Mexico) is a Mexican retired female boxer. Salazar, fights as a Heavyweight. She is former WBC world Heavyweight champion. Her nickname is "The Shadow". She hails from San Francisco, California. She was born in Ocotlan, Jalisco, Mexico (view the ESPN note at November 11;).

Salazar became the third Hispanic to become world Heavyweight champion in all of boxing's history, and the second one in women's boxing history. The first Hispanic to win a world Heavyweight championship in boxing was male boxer John Ruiz of Puerto Rico.

Career
Salazar debuted as a professional boxer on March 25, 2001, defeating Denise Callahan by a four round decision in Hayward, California. She followed that victory with two back to back wins over Carley Pesente, defeating Pesente twice by four round unanimous decisions, both times in Tacoma, Washington.

Salazar won two more fights, including a six round decision win on November 16, 2002, over Kisha Snow, who had six wins and only one loss coming into their fight.

On March 1, 2003, Salazar made her Las Vegas debut. She suffered her first career defeat that night, being beaten on points over four rounds by former NCAA basketball star Vonda Ward, who ran her record to sixteen victories and no losses after beating Salazar.

Salazar rebounded with her first knockout win, however, when she beat Pesente in their third bout, held on May 24, in Vallejo, California. Salazar beat Pesente in the first round.

Salazar received her first world title shot after that win, attempting to win the IBA world Heavyweight title on June 11, 2003, when she lost by a ten round decision to Ward in their rematch, held at Canton, Ohio.

On March 18, 2004, Salazar met Marsha Valley in California and she lost for the second time in a row, this time by a split six round decision.

On October 16, she and Valley met in a rematch, fighting in Oakland, for the World Boxing Empire's world super heavyweight title. The Super Heavyweight division is a division that is only recognized in amateur boxing and by a couple of women's boxing organizations. It is not recognized at all in men's boxing. Salazar avenged her earlier loss to Valley and, nevertheless, became a world champion for the first time, when she defeated Valley by an eight round unanimous decision.

Salazar went down in weight to compete for the world Heavyweight championship for the second time, when she was offered a chance to meet Pamela London for the WIBF's vacant world Heavyweight title.

On November 28, 2004, Salazar had her first fight abroad when she and London met in Guyana. With a weight of 240 pounds (109 kg) for that fight, Salazar became the WIBF world Heavyweight champion, by knocking London out in nine rounds.

On November 8, 2014, Salazar won the biggest title in her career, winning the WBC World Heavyweight Title. She won the title against Tanzee Daniel by Unanimous Decision. She lost the title in March 2016 against Alejandra Jimenez in Mexico.

On March 14, 2017, Salazar announced her retirement from all combat fighting.

Professional boxing titles
WBE female super heavyweight title (237 Ibs)
WIBF heavyweight title (240 Ibs)
WBE female heavyweight title (236½ Ibs)
WBC female heavyweight title (235 Ibs)

Combat record

Boxing

Mixed martial arts record

|-
| Lose
| style="text-align:center;" | 0–1
|  Lana Stefanac
| Submission (Guillotine Choke)
| Extreme Wars 3 - Bay Area Brawl
| 
| style="text-align:center;" | 1
| style="text-align:center;" | 2:09
| Oakland, California, United States
|
|}

References

1970 births
Living people
American women boxers
Boxers from San Francisco
American boxers of Mexican descent
American female mixed martial artists
Mixed martial artists utilizing boxing
World boxing champions
People from Ocotlán, Jalisco
Boxers from Jalisco
21st-century American women